The downloadable content (DLC) available for Call of Duty: Modern Warfare 3 is an assortment of additional multiplayer maps, Special Ops missions, and Face-Off Maps that came as part of the Call of Duty ELITE Premium membership. Downloadable content was split into four unique "Content Collections," each with 2-3 content packs. The first content collection was made available on January 24, 2012 for Xbox 360 users. The DLC collections could be bought separately for a fee of $30.

History
At E3 2010, Microsoft announced that any DLC released for the Call of Duty series would arrive on the Xbox 360 first. This agreement applied to the games Call of Duty: Black Ops, Call of Duty: Modern Warfare 3 and Call of Duty: Black Ops II.

During the release of Modern Warfare 3 and Call of Dutys Elite service, premium members of the service were promised 20 pieces of DLC over a 9-month period, with content releases for each platform every month. This number was increased to 22 on Call of Dutys official Elite Content Calendar. Initially, all downloadable content was only available to Call of Duty: Elite premium members. Xbox 360 users received all DLC about a month before PlayStation 3 users regardless of Elite membership due to a special contract between Microsoft and Activision. As an example, the first Collection dropped on Xbox 360 on January 24, and on February 28 on the PS3.

Face-Off
On May 9, 2012, it was announced that the Face-Off mode would be introduced to Modern Warfare 3. It included smaller maps, which promoted fast gameplay matches. Face-Off included options for 1v1, 2v2, and 3v3 battles. Two free Face-Off maps became available for all Xbox Live Gold subscribers on May 15, 2012, regardless of Call of Duty: Elite membership. There is now a dedicated public playlist for the Face-Off game mode.

Content Drops
Content Drops were released monthly exclusively to all Call of Duty: Elite premium and founder members. There were a total of 9 monthly DLC releases up until the end of Modern Warfare 3s 2012 content season.  September was the last month DLC was released for Xbox 360, and October was the last month for PlayStation 3. Since Call of Duty: Elite was not available for PC gamers, DLC was only released in the form of Content Collections.

Content Collections
Content Collections were distributed in the same way DLC in previous Call of Duty titles was. Multiple maps and Spec Ops missions were placed into one collection for anyone to purchase through the Xbox Marketplace, PlayStation Store, or Steam for PC. No Call of Duty: Elite membership is required to download Content Collections.

Free DLC
Some DLC was available to all users of Modern Warfare 3 regardless of their Call of Duty: Elite membership, and was completely free to the player.

References

Modern Warfare 3
Call of Duty: Modern Warfare 3